"Wait 'Till the Sun Shines, Nellie" is a 1905 popular song with music written by Harry Von Tilzer and lyrics by Andrew B. Sterling.

History 

"Wait 'Till the Sun Shines, Nellie" has been recorded many times and is now considered a pop standard. The first recorded versions were by Byron G. Harlan and Harry Tally.

Bing Crosby and Mary Martin sang it in the 1941 film Birth of the Blues and also recorded it for Decca Records on March 13, 1942. Harry James recorded a version in 1941 on Columbia 36466.

In a long-standing tradition, floor traders at the New York Stock Exchange sing this song on the last trading day of every year and on Christmas Eve. The song has been the stock exchange anthem at least back as far as 1934.

It is also a popular song in barbershop music.

It appeared as a country music hit as performed by the Golden Memory Boys in the summer of 1940.

In the months before his death in 1959, Buddy Holly made a recording of "Wait 'Till the Sun Shines, Nellie" and other songs now called the "Apartment Tapes", which he was making as notes for himself while chilling in his living room at his home in New York City. Nowadays this cover of "Wait 'Till the Sun Shines, Nellie" by Buddy Holly is at the top of searches on YouTube for this song title. His original recording by himself on guitar can be found. Also the released version which has been remixed with added 'backup singers' and instruments is easy to find and is a longer version.

A sample of the song, sung a capella by Tom Bromley, an elderly First World War veteran, appears on the Roger Waters 1992 album Amused to Death at the end of the track "What God Wants (Part III)". The clip is from BBC television's 1991 Everyman documentary, "A Game of Ghosts".

Film appearances
The song has been featured in many films and found ideal for the purpose of evoking a period flavor.
 1941 Birth of the Blues
 1941 The Strawberry Blonde
 1947 I Wonder Who's Kissing Her Now - sung on stage by a quartet
 1949 In the Good Old Summertime - sung by George Boyce, Eddie Jackson, Joe Niemeyer, and Charles Smith
 1950 Father Is a Bachelor
 1952 Wait Till the Sun Shines, Nellie
 2013 The Pink Marble Egg - sung by Jonathan King

References

External links

1905 songs
1900s song stubs
Songs with music by Harry Von Tilzer
Songs with lyrics by Andrew B. Sterling